Mission is an unincorporated community in Mission Township, Crow Wing County, Minnesota, United States, near Crosby and Merrifield. It is along Crow Wing County Road 11 near Mission Way.

References

Unincorporated communities in Crow Wing County, Minnesota
Unincorporated communities in Minnesota